Rudolf Jaenisch (born on April 22, 1942) is a Professor of Biology at MIT and a founding member of the Whitehead Institute for Biomedical Research. He is a pioneer of transgenic science, in which an animal’s genetic makeup is altered. Jaenisch has focused on creating genetically modified mice to study cancer and neurological diseases.

Research 
Jaenisch’s first breakthrough occurred in 1974, when he and Beatrice Mintz showed that foreign DNA could be integrated into the DNA of early mouse embryos They injected retrovirus DNA into early mouse embryos and showed that leukemia DNA sequences had integrated into the mouse genome and also into that of its offspring. These mice were the first transgenic mammals in history.

His current research focuses on the epigenetic regulation of gene expression, which has led to major advances in creating embryonic stem cells and “induced pluripotent stem" (IPS) cells, as well as their therapeutic applications. In 2007, Jaenisch’s laboratory was one of the first three laboratories worldwide to report reprogramming cells taken from a mouse's tail into IPS cells. Jaenisch has since shown therapeutic benefits of IPS cell-based treatment for sickle-cell anemia and Parkinson's disease in mice. Additional research focuses on the epigenetic mechanisms involved in cancer and brain development.

Jaenisch’s therapeutic cloning research deals exclusively with mice, but he is an advocate for using the same techniques with human cells in order to advance embryonic stem cell research. However, in 2001, Jaenisch made a public case against human reproductive cloning, testifying before a U.S. House of Representatives subcommittee and writing an editorial in Science magazine.

Career 
Jaenisch received his doctorate in medicine from the University of Munich in 1967, preferring the laboratory to the clinic. He became a postdoc at the Max Planck Institute in Munich, studying bacteriophages. He left Germany in 1970 for research positions at Princeton University, Fox Chase Institute for Cancer Research and the Salk Institute. He returned to Germany in 1977 to become the head of the Department of Tumor Virology at the Heinrich Pette Institute at the University of Hamburg. He arrived at MIT in 1984. He participated in the 2005 science conference on human cloning at the United Nations and serves on the science advisory boards of the Genetics Policy Institute and Stemgent. He also served on the Life Sciences jury for the Infosys Prize in 2010.

Awards and honors 
 2001 Inaugural Genetics Prize of the Gruber Foundation
 2002 Robert Koch Prize
 2003 Election as a member of U.S. National Academy of Sciences
 2006 Max Delbrück Medal
 2007 Vilcek Prize in Biomedical Science
 2008 Massry Prize from the Keck School of Medicine
 2009 Ernst Schering Prize
 2010 National Medal of Science
 2011 Wolf Prize in Medicine
2012 International Society for Stem Cell Research McEwen Innovation Award
 2013 Benjamin Franklin Medal in Life Science from the Franklin Institute
 2013 Passano Award
 2014 Otto Warburg Medal
 2015 March of Dimes Prize in Developmental Biology
 2016 Semantic Scholar AI program included Jaenisch on its list of top ten most influential biomedical researchers.

References

External links 

1942 births
Living people
Fellows of the AACR Academy
20th-century German biologists
German geneticists
History of genetics
Knights Commander of the Order of Merit of the Federal Republic of Germany
Massry Prize recipients
Members of the United States National Academy of Sciences
People from Bystrzyca Kłodzka
Recipients of the Pour le Mérite (civil class)
Whitehead Institute faculty
Wolf Prize in Medicine laureates
Members of the National Academy of Medicine
Academic staff of the University of Hamburg
Fox Chase Cancer Center people